Church of St. Elizabeth is a  Roman Catholic parish church in the Roman Catholic Archdiocese of New York, located at West 187th Street at Wadsworth Avenue in Washington Heights, Manhattan, New York City. The parish was established in 1869, originally located on 187th Street at Broadway from 1869 to 1929.

The parish was founded in 1869 in what was then known as Fort Washington by the Rev. Cornelius O’Callaghan. The parish's founding meant that it took on as an out-mission St. John's in the Bronx, which was then being administered to by the Jesuits of Fordham University. St. John's broke off as its own parish in 1877. The original address, as listed in 1892, was at King's Bridge Road, near 187th Street.

Buildings
The present Neo-Gothic stone church was begun in 1927 with designs by architect Robert J. Reiley. A three-storey brick and stone rectory on West 187th Street was built in 1913 for $20,000 to designs by architect Edward Lee Young of 12 East 30th Street.

References

External links

Roman Catholic churches completed in 1913
Roman Catholic churches completed in 1929
Religious organizations established in 1869
Gothic Revival church buildings in New York City
Roman Catholic churches in Manhattan
Washington Heights, Manhattan
1869 establishments in New York (state)
20th-century Roman Catholic church buildings in the United States